Marmaduke James Hussey, Baron Hussey of North Bradley (29 August 1923 – 27 December 2006), known as Duke Hussey, was Chairman of the Board of Governors of the BBC from 1986 to 1996, serving two terms in that role.

Education and career
The son of the athlete and colonial administrator Eric Hussey and his wife, Christine Elizabeth Morley, Marmaduke Hussey was educated at Rugby School and Trinity College, Oxford. He served in the Grenadier Guards in World War II and was severely injured at Anzio, having to have a leg amputated as a prisoner-of-war, which resulted in his repatriation.

He joined Associated Newspapers where he had a long career, culminating in being appointed managing director. He subsequently joined Times Newspapers as chief executive and managing director, a post he held from 1971 to 1980.

Chairman of the BBC
He was appointed Chairman of the BBC in 1986, upon the death of Stuart Young, thanks in part to his close connections to the ruling Conservative Party.

Within three months of joining the BBC, he had forced the resignation of the Director-General, Alasdair Milne, following a series of rows in recent years between the BBC and the Conservative government. In the 1990s, Hussey fell out with Director General John Birt over his management style and Panorama's controversial interview with Diana, Princess of Wales in 1995.

On 11 September 1996, Hussey was made a life peer as Baron Hussey of North Bradley, of North Bradley in the County of Wiltshire.

Hussey gave up several boardroom appointments when he took up his job at the BBC, but he remained chairman of the Royal Marsden Hospital until 1998.

Family
Hussey married Lady Susan Waldegrave, youngest daughter of Geoffrey Waldegrave, 12th Earl Waldegrave, on 25 April 1959. She was a Woman of the Bedchamber to Elizabeth II and is a godmother to William, Prince of Wales. They had two children: James Arthur (b. 1961) and Katharine Elizabeth (b. 1964) who  married Sir Francis Brooke.

Death
Marmaduke Hussey died at the age of 83 on 27 December 2006.

In popular culture
Hussey is portrayed by Richard Cordery in season 5 of The Crown.

Arms

References

Further reading

External links
 Obituary: Lord Hussey of North Bradley, BBC News, 27 December 2006.
 Lord Hussey, The Daily Telegraph, 28 December 2006.
  Obituary, The Independent, 28 December 2006.
 Ex-BBC chairman Lord Hussey dies, BBC News, 27 December 2006.

1923 births
2006 deaths
Alumni of Trinity College, Oxford
BBC Governors
Chairmen of the BBC
Grenadier Guards officers
British Army personnel of World War II
Crossbench life peers
People educated at Rugby School
English amputees
British World War II prisoners of war
Royalty and nobility with disabilities
World War II prisoners of war held by Germany
Life peers created by Elizabeth II